Rivera High School can refer to:
 Simon Rivera High School - Brownsville, Texas - Brownsville Independent School District
 Diego Rivera Learning Complex - Los Angeles, California - Los Angeles Unified School District